Antun "Ante" Kovačić (June 6, 1854 – March 10, 1889) was a Croatian writer who is best known for his magnum opus work U registraturi.

Biography

Early life 
Born to a family of Croatian peasants in Hrvatsko Zagorje, Kovačić made his way through law school to become an attorney. He was born in Celine Goričke, a village near Marija Gorica.

His parents were Ana Vugrinec and Ivan Kovačić (1826–1906). They were married in Marija Gorica. Ivan was also called Janko and dreamed that Ante would become a priest.

In 1857, Ante and his parents went to Oplaznik.

Later life 
Kovačić began to write in 1875. While his early works have Romantic tendencies, in later years he was influenced by Realist literature. His stories and novels often had strong satiric overtones and represent harsh criticism to injustice in Croatian society of his time. One of his novels, Među žabari, remained unfinished because citizens of Karlovac protested after reading its first paragraphs in a local newspaper.

The best known work of Ante Kovačić is semi-autobiographic novel U registraturi (1888). In it he expressed great deal of sympathy for common Croatian people, most notably peasants whom he saw as superior to snobbish citizenry.

Kovačić was known as a staunch supporter of Ante Starčević and his Croatian Party of Rights. As such he was bitterly opposed to Ivan Mažuranić and wrote literal travesty of Mažuranić's poem The Death of Smail-aga Čengić.

In his later years, Kovačić began to show symptoms of mental disorder which gradually affected his work, including the last chapters of U registraturi.

U registraturi, combining biting social satire, naturalist descriptions of Croatian bureaucracy and peasantry, as well as fascination with the supernatural inherited from Romanticism, nevertheless remained the most powerful 19th century Croatian novel and one of the most enduring novels in Croatian history. In 1974 it was adapted into popular television mini-series starring Rade Šerbedžija.

Death 

Kovačić died of pneumonia in psychiatric hospital in Vrapče, Zagreb. He was insane at the moment of his death.

He was buried at Mirogoj Cemetery.

Family 
Kovačić's wife was called Milka Hajdin, with whom he had six children. Ante and Milka were married in Mala Gorica. Their daughters Olga and Marija were teachers, while their son Krešimir was a journalist, who died in 1960.

Works 
Zagorski čudak
Fiškal
Smrt babe Čengićkinje
Baruničina ljubav
Među žabari
U registraturi

Sources

External links

1854 births
1889 deaths
Croatian nationalists
Croatian novelists
Croatian male writers
Male novelists
Croatian lawyers
Burials at Mirogoj Cemetery
Deaths from pneumonia in Austria-Hungary
People with schizophrenia
19th-century novelists
19th-century male writers
19th-century Croatian writers